Lieutenant-General Mohinder Singh Wadalia (30 November 1908 – 20 May 2001) was an Indian Army general.

Career
A King's Commissioned Indian Officer (KCIO), Wadalia was educated at Aitchison College and the Prince of Wales Royal Indian Military College,Dehra Dun. He subsequently attended the Royal Military Academy Sandhurst and was commissioned a second lieutenant in the British Indian Army on 31 January 1929, passing out fifth in the order of merit from 37 successful cadets. He was formally appointed to the Indian Army as an officer with the 4/19 Hyderabad Regiment (now 4 Kumaon Regiment) on 13 April 1930. On 1 March 1934, he transferred to the 16th Light Cavalry and was appointed a squadron officer. He was appointed the adjutant on 1 January 1937.

During the Second World War, Wadalia was appointed a GSO 3 in the Directorate of Military Training on 27 June 1941, under Brigadier Francis Tuker. Advanced to a GSO 2 on 26 September and promoted temporary major in December, Wadalia was transferred to the Directorate of Armoured Fighting Vehicles on 26 May 1943. He served on the headquarters staff in the Persia-Iraq theatre and was mentioned in dispatches. On 13 August 1944, he was appointed a GSO 1 on the staff, with the acting rank of lieutenant-colonel. He was promoted substantive major (temporary lieutenant-colonel) on 31 January 1946. On 23 December 1949, he was promoted temporary brigadier and given command of a brigade. 

On 21 June 1951, Wadalia was appointed an area commander with the local rank of major general. On 1 September, he was appointed Commandant of the National Defence Academy with the acting rank of major-general. He was the Deputy Chief of the Army Staff between 27 January 1959 and 15 November 1964.

Dates of rank

Notes

References

1908 births
2001 deaths
British Indian Army officers
Indian Army personnel of World War II
People of the Indo-Pakistani War of 1947
Indian generals
Indian Army personnel
Graduates of the Royal Military Academy Sandhurst
Commandants of the National Defence Academy
Commandants of Indian Military Academy